Alinur Aktaş (born 1970, in İnegöl, Turkey) is a Turkish politician in the AKP and the current Mayor of Bursa since 2017.

Personal life
He was born in 1970, in the İnegöl district of the Bursa Province. After graduating from primary school and high school in İnegöl, he graduated from Uludağ University in Bursa. Alinur Aktaş is married and is also a father to two children.

Politics
His political life began as a member of AKP. He was elected as the Mayor of İnegöl in the 28 March 2004 elections. During his time being mayor, İnegöl became the second biggest city of the Southern Marmara Region. After the resignation of Bursa Mayor Recep Altepe, Alinur Aktaş was elected to be his successor. He is famous for putting himself on multiple payrolls by appointing himself as the president of every city council owned company.

References 

Living people
1970 births
Mayors of places in Turkey
Justice and Development Party (Turkey) politicians
21st-century Turkish politicians